Heather Bauer is an American politician of the Democratic Party. She is the member of the South Carolina House of Representatives representing District 75. In the 2022 general election for South Carolina House of Representatives District 75, Bauer defeated Republican Kirkman Finlay III, who had been a member of the South Carolina House since 2012. Bauer was outraised by Finlay, but prevailed due to public concern about women's reproductive rights.

Bauer is a member of the House Agriculture, Natural Resources and Environmental Affairs Committee.

Statements were issued by both the South Carolina Democratic Party and the South Carolina Republican Party. Bauer had previously run for a Columbia City Council At-Large seat.

References 

Living people
Democratic Party members of the South Carolina House of Representatives
21st-century American politicians
Year of birth missing (living people)
Women state legislators in South Carolina
21st-century American women politicians
University of South Carolina alumni
Indiana University of Pennsylvania alumni